Benjamin Francis Dark (10 November 1793 – 30 May 1836) was an English amateur cricketer who made 6 known appearances in first-class matches from 1814 to 1826.  He was the elder brother of James Dark.

He was mainly associated with Middlesex and Hampshire.

References

1793 births
1836 deaths
English cricketers
English cricketers of 1787 to 1825
Hampshire cricketers
Middlesex cricketers
Cricket patrons
Marylebone Cricket Club cricketers
19th-century British philanthropists
George Osbaldeston's XI cricketers